The Mona Plummer Aquatic Center is the aquatic center used by the Arizona State University Sun Devils swim team. It opened in 1981, cost four million dollars to build, and is named after Mona Plummer. Plummer was a national championship winning coach who died in 1979; she coached during three decades.

The complex consists of three pools, including an Olympic-size competition pool, and a diving platform; it has seating for 2,000. It is located on the ASU campus in Tempe, Arizona. The facility hosted the 1989, 1991, 1993, and 1998 Pac-10 Diving Championships, as well as the 1981, 1991, and 1999 NCAA Zone E Diving Championships. The venue is regarded as one of the best collegiate aquatic centers in the nation.

In October 2011, a former ASU swimmer drowned at the facility.

References

External links 
 

 
Sports venues in Tempe, Arizona
Arizona State University buildings
1981 establishments in Arizona
Sports venues completed in 1981
Arizona State Sun Devils swimming and diving